The 2016 TCR International Series Sochi round was the seventh round of the 2016 TCR International Series season. It took place on 2–3 July at the Sochi Autodrom.

Stefano Comini won the first race, starting from pole position, driving a Volkswagen Golf GTI TCR, and Mikhail Grachev gained the second one, driving a Honda Civic TCR.

Ballast
Due to the results obtained in the previous round, Dušan Borković received +30 kg, Maťo Homola +20 kg and James Nash +10 kg.

In addition, the Balance of Performance was reviewed for this round: the Volkswagen Golf GTI TCR's ride height has been reduced by 10mm.

Classification

Qualifying

Race 1

Notes
 — James Nash was given a 10-second penalty for causing a collision with Jean-Karl Vernay.
 — Dušan Borković was given a 30-second penalty for exceeding track limits repeatedly during the race.

Race 2

Notes
 — Maťo Homola was given a 5-second penalty for not being lined up correctly in his starting position.
 — Davit Kajaia was given a 30-second penalty for exceeding track limits repeatedly during the race.

Standings after the event

Drivers' Championship standings

Model of the Year standings

Teams' Championship standings

 Note: Only the top five positions are included for both sets of drivers' standings.

References

External links
TCR International Series official website

Sochi
TCR
Sochi TCR